The Critics' Choice Television Award for Most Exciting New Series was one of the award categories presented annually by the Broadcast Television Journalists Association. It was introduced in 2011 when the event was first initiated and last presented in 2016.

Process
The winners are selected by a group of television critics that are part of the Broadcast Television Critics Association. Unlike other categories, this one honors all genres and every nominee is a winner. This category is for the most exciting new series of the next television season/year.

Winners

2010s

* Shows were not renewed for a second season

References

Critics' Choice Television Awards
Awards established in 2011
Awards disestablished in 2016
2011 establishments in the United States
2016 disestablishments in the United States